Ramaz may refer to:
Moses ben Mordecai Zacuto, 17th century kabbalist
Moses S. Margolies (1851–1936), rabbi and namesake of the Ramaz School
Ramaz School, New York (Upper East Side), Jewish prep school
 Ramaz Shengelia (1957–2012), Soviet footballer